Aleksandar Popović may refer to:

 Aleksandar Popović (sprinter) (born 1957), Yugoslav Olympic sprinter 
 Aleksandar Popović (politician) (born 1971), Yugoslav sprinter, Serbian politician
 Aleksandar Popović (writer) (1929–1996), Serbian playwright
 Aleksandar Popović (footballer, born 1983), Austrian-born Serbian football player
 Aleksandar Popović (footballer, born 1999), Serbian football goalkeeper
 Aleksandar Popović (1950s tennis player), Yugoslavian Davis Cup tennis player
 Aleksandar Popović (1920s tennis player), Yugoslavian Davis Cup tennis player